William Parker (1 September 1886 – 30 July 1915) was an English cricketer. He played two first-class matches for Marylebone Cricket Club between 1913 and 1914. He was killed in action during World War I.

See also
 List of cricketers who were killed during military service

References

External links
 

1886 births
1915 deaths
English cricketers
Marylebone Cricket Club cricketers
People from Belgaum
British military personnel killed in World War I
British Army cricketers
Military personnel of British India
British Army personnel of World War I
Rifle Brigade officers